The 1989 Calgary Stampeders finished in 2nd place in the West Division with a 10–8 record. They were defeated in the West Semi-Final by the Saskatchewan Roughriders.

Offseason

CFL Draft

Preseason

Regular season

Season Standings

Season schedule

Awards and records

1989 CFL All-Stars

Western All-Star Selections

Playoffs

West Semi-Final

References

Calgary Stampeders seasons
1989 Canadian Football League season by team